Carabus rutilans is a species of ground beetle in the Carabinae subfamily that can be found in Andorra, France, and Spain.

References

rutilans
Beetles described in 1826
Beetles of Europe